Skinnamarink TV is a children's television show created by Richard Mortimer. The series originally aired on The Learning Channel programming block on Ready Set Learn in the United States and CBC Television in Canada. It was created by Lynn Harvey and Richard Mortimer (Twist Productions) for Skinnamarink Entertainment in association with Craftsman & Scribes Creative Workshop, The Learning Channel, and the Canadian Broadcasting Corporation (CBC).

Plot
It starred Sharon, Lois and Bram and two new characters C.C. Copycat, a sarcastic blue feline played by Dwayne Adams, and Ella Acapella, a young female elephant, played by Tikka Sherman.

The show mocked the life of an actual television station. It included many skits and musical bits with Sharon, Lois & Bram acting as many different characters. Along with Ella Acapella and C.C. Copycat, Sharon, Lois & Bram operate a fictional TV station called Skinnamarink TV. The name comes from the song Skidamarink which closed the trio's original program, The Elephant Show.

The wraparounds involved the Big Red Button which did various things to the studio and the group.

Segments
 A Nosey Moment with Nosey Parker - Similar to Nosey's Park, in some episodes of Season 2, a segment would be interrupted by Nosey Parker entering the scene with her cleaning cart and giving advice to someone on a certain subject.
 Construction Site - A how-to craft show where construction worker Sheamus O'Toole (Bram) shows kids how to make crafts.
 Cookie's Diner - A bakery show where Cookie LaFrano (Lois), the diner's owner, sings songs and makes food for her customers.
 Crazy Jake's Joke Emporium - About a crazy jokester named Crazy Jake (Bram) who tells jokes to kids and Ella hiding in the doors of a wall wondering if they knew it. This segment is considered to be a commercial rather than a show. The segment is almost similar to the "joke wall" of Rowan & Martin's Laugh-In. 
 Creepy Time - Sharon, Lois and Bram play siblings who get scared by things that go bump in the night.
 Ellavision - A show hosted by Ella during season 2 where kids try to guess a secret word that would open up the Ellavision rock. C.C. Copycat and his ventriloquist dummy Copykitty are her co-hosts.
 Finger Play - A song or story is sung or told by either Sharon, Lois or Bram with their fingers. This was used during Season 2.
 Go-Go-Go - A workout show featuring Patti Pert (Sharon) and kids doing exercises through songs. Lois and Bram also make appearances along with Ella and C.C. Copycat.
 Good News - A news program where tongue-tied news anchor Lianna Brianna Smith (Sharon) interviews certain people.
 Good Sports - Similar to "Good News", but it focuses more on sports with sports reporter Kenny G. Whiz (Lois).
 Good Weather - Similar to "Good News" and "Good Sports," but it focuses more on weather with weatherman Percy P. Tation (Bram).
 Hmmm - A science show about a scientist Professor Hmmm (Bram) and his assistant (Ella). In season 2, Professor Hmmm's two sisters Professor Ohhh (Sharon) and Professor Ahhh (Lois) would sometimes help him with his experiments.
 Inspector Gumshoe - About a detective named Inspector Gumshoe (Bram) and his sidekick (Ella)
 The Late Late Show - A show about old movies. Sharon, Lois, Bram, C.C., and Ella play certain characters for the movie.
 Lost From Space - A parody of the television series Lost in Space.
 Nosey's Park - Nosey Parker (Lois) randomly walks into a park and gives advice to someone on a certain subject. This was used during Season 1.
 Really Big Shoo - Sharon, Lois, and Bram perform a musical number on a stage
 Rhyme Time - In this segment, Bram plays someone numerous, and rhymes something.
 Silly Sonata - A concert show where C.C. Copycat, Sharon, Lois and Bram perform silly renditions of different orchestra songs.
 Story Time - An elderly woman named Grandma Griselda (Sharon) tells stories to the viewers from a huge, dusty storybook on her shelf, but she tells stories the way kids have never heard before.
 Soap Opera - A musical soap opera.
 The Farm Report - Henny Hayseed (aka Cousin Henny) (Lois) hosts a talk show on a farm accompanied by three kids. She has special guests that are animals appear on her show. After Henny talks with the special guest, she performs a song related to the guest. In some episodes, Henny's cousins Penny (Sharon) and Lenny (Bram) would come to the farm for a visit.
 The Singing Sage - The Singing Sage, a fortune teller (Sharon) tries to solve people's problems through song.
 2 of a Kind - A sitcom about two conjoined twins named Milly and Tilly (Sharon and Lois.)
 What to Wear - A fashion show where fashion expert Chi Chi Darling (Lois) advises kids what to wear in all circumstances.
 What Zat? - A game show where contestants can guess something, where C.C. Copycat is the host, Ella is the hostess, and Sharon, Lois and Bram as characters from other sketches are the contestants.
 Window Dressing - Sharon, Lois, and Bram, are dressed as models in different clothes inside the window of a clothing store. They are frozen when the store manager (Ella) is around, but when she is absent, they come to life and sing a song.

Episodes

Season 1 (1997–98)

Season 2 (1998–99)

Album
The trio's 1998 album, Skinnamarink TV won a Juno Award in 2000. The album featured songs from the television show. The song I Have A Little Tricycle which appeared on the album was added to the 2000 Juno Collection 2-CD Set.

External links

 
 Skinnamarink TV at Ameba TV

Children's sketch comedy
TLC (TV network) original programming
CBC Television original programming
1997 American television series debuts
1997 Canadian television series debuts
1999 American television series endings
1999 Canadian television series endings
1990s American children's comedy television series
1990s Canadian children's television series
1990s American sketch comedy television series
1990s Canadian sketch comedy television series
1990s preschool education television series
Canadian children's comedy television series
American preschool education television series
Canadian preschool education television series
American television shows featuring puppetry
Canadian television shows featuring puppetry
English-language television shows
Television series about cats
Television series about elephants